Farley (formerly Woodlawn-Oakdale) is a census-designated place (CDP) in McCracken County, Kentucky, United States. The population was 4,701 at the 2010 census, a decline from 4,937 in 2000. It is part of the Paducah, KY-IL Micropolitan Statistical Area.

Geography
Farley (Woodlawn-Oakdale) is located at  (37.043786, −88.571223).

Demographics

As of the census of 2000, there were 4,937 people, 2,049 households, and 1,407 families residing in the CDP. The racial makeup of the CDP was 94.55% White, 2.51% African American, 0.41% Native American, 0.41% Asian, 0.10% Pacific Islander, 0.34% from other races, and 1.68% from two or more races. Hispanic or Latino of any race were 0.87% of the population.

There were 2,049 households, out of which 32.2% had children under the age of 18 living with them, 51.0% were married couples living together, 13.2% had a female householder with no husband present, and 31.3% were non-families. 26.7% of all households were made up of individuals, and 9.7% had someone living alone who was 65 years of age or older. The average household size was 2.41 and the average family size was 2.89.

In the CDP, the population was spread out, with 25.1% under the age of 18, 8.9% from 18 to 24, 30.4% from 25 to 44, 23.5% from 45 to 64, and 12.0% who were 65 years of age or older. The median age was 35 years. For every 100 females, there were 92.6 males. For every 100 females age 18 and over, there were 89.8 males.

The median income for a household in the CDP was $27,313, and the median income for a family was $31,658. Males had a median income of $28,789 versus $17,316 for females. The per capita income for the CDP was $13,344. About 17.6% of families and 21.3% of the population were below the poverty line, including 27.8% of those under age 18 and 14.0% of those age 65 or over.

References

Census-designated places in McCracken County, Kentucky
Census-designated places in Kentucky
Paducah micropolitan area